Trapezoid may refer to:

Trapezoid or trapezium, a geometric figure
Trapezoid bone, a bone in the hand
Trapezoid (band), an American folk music group
Trapezoid or trapezius muscle
Goaltender trapezoid, an area of a hockey rink
Trapezoid, a former musical project of Neil Cicierega before he formed Lemon Demon

See also
Trapeze, an acrobatic device shaped like a trapezoid
Trapezium (disambiguation)